Ken Morgan may refer to:

 Dakta Green (born 1950), New Zealand cannabis law reform activist
 Ken Morgan (trade unionist) (1928–2015), English trade union leader
 Ken Morgan (footballer) (1932–2008), Welsh footballer
 Ken Morgan (politician) (born 1951), American politician